Garett Whiteley  is an American mixed martial artist who competes in the Lightweight division. He is currently signed with the UFC.

MMA career 
After turning pro in mid 2010, Whiteley went undefeated with a perfect 7-0 record, 6 of which did not go past the first round. He holds a win over UFC veteran Jason Gilliam.

Ultimate Fighting Championship 
Whiteley made his UFC debut at UFC Fight Night 29 in Brazil, against fellow Octagon newcomer Alan Patrick. Whiteley was defeated by first round technical knockout.

In his second fight with the promotion, Whiteley fought Vinc Pichel at UFC Fight Night: Rockhold vs. Philippou. Whiteley lost the fight via unanimous decision.

Whiteley next fought David Michaud on December 13, 2014 at UFC on Fox: dos Santos vs. Miocic. He lost the fight via unanimous decision.

Mixed martial arts record

|-
|Loss
|align=center| 7–3
|David Michaud
|Decision (unanimous)
|UFC on Fox: dos Santos vs. Miocic
|
|align=center| 3
|align=center| 5:00
|Phoenix, Arizona, United States
|
|-
|Loss
|align=center| 7–2
|Vinc Pichel
|Decision (unanimous)
|UFC Fight Night: Rockhold vs. Philippou
|
|align=center| 3
|align=center| 5:00
|Duluth, Georgia, United States
|
|-
|Loss
|align=center| 7–1
|Alan Patrick
|TKO (punches)
|UFC Fight Night 29
|
|align=center| 1
|align=center| 3:54
|Barueri, São Paulo, Brazil
|
|-
|Win
|align=center| 7–0
|Jason Gilliam
|TKO (punches)
|Midwest Fight Series
|
|align=center|1
|align=center|0:45
|Indianapolis, Indiana, United States
|
|-
|Win
|align=center| 6–0
|John Morehouse
|TKO (punches)
|Midwest Fight Series
|
|align=center|1
|align=center|4:39
|Indianapolis, Indiana, United States
|
|-
|Win
|align=center| 5–0
|Evan DeLong
|Submission (triangle choke)
|Absolute Cage Fighting 2
|
|align=center|3
|align=center|4:36
|Indianapolis, Indiana, United States
|
|-
|Win
|align=center| 4–0
|Joel Miller
|TKO (punches)
|Absolute Cage Fighting 1
|
|align=center|1
|align=center|0:39
|Indianapolis, Indiana, United States
|
|-
|Win
|align=center| 3–0
|Ryan McIntosh
|Submission (punches)
|PCF - TWC 9: Berserk
|
|align=center|1
|align=center|2:32
|Indianapolis, Indiana, United States
|
|-
|Win
|align=center| 2–0
|Bryan Neville
|TKO (knees & punches)
|LOF 44 - Against All Odds
|
|align=center|1
|align=center|1:30
|Indianapolis, Indiana, United States
|
|-
|Win
|align=center| 1–0
|Miles Shrake
|Submission (rear naked choke)
|PCF - Total Warrior Challenge 6
|
|align=center|1
|align=center|3:13
|Indianapolis, Indiana, United States
|
|-

References

External links
 
 

Lightweight mixed martial artists
People from Indianapolis
American male mixed martial artists
Ultimate Fighting Championship male fighters